Goodyear is a surname. Notable people with the surname include:

Albert Goodyear, American archaeologist in South Carolina
Anson Goodyear (1877–1964), American businessman and philanthropist
Charles Goodyear (1800–1860), inventor of vulcanized rubber, Goodyear Tire Company
Charles Goodyear (1804–1876), United States Representative from New York
Charles W. Goodyear (1846–1911), American lawyer, turned lumber and railway industrialist
Chip Goodyear (born 1958), former CEO of BHP Billiton
Dana Goodyear (born 1976), American journalist and poet
Gary Goodyear (born 1958), Canadian politician
George Goodyear (1801–1884), American clergyman
George Goodyear (footballer) (1916–2001), English footballer
John Goodyear (1920–2002), American football player for the Washington Redskins
Joseph Goodyear (1799–1839), English engraver
Julie Goodyear (born 1942), British television actress
Langdon Goodyear, Jr. (1924–2006), mayor of Eau Gallie, Florida in 1956
Miles Goodyear (1817–1849), American fur trader and mountain man
Paige Goodyear (born 2000), English boxer
R. A. H. Goodyear (1877–1948), English writer
Sara Suleri Goodyear (1953–2022), professor of English at Yale University
Scott Goodyear (born 1959), Canadian race car driver
Stewart Goodyear (born 1978), Canadian concert pianist and composer 
Tim Goodyear (born 1977), American comics publisher and artist
William Goodyear (1865–1936), American football coach, newspaper editor, publisher, and politician
William Henry Goodyear (1846–1923), architectural historian and museum curator, son of Charles Goodyear

See also
Goodere, a surname
Goodier, a surname
Goodyer, a surname
Goodyear family